Takshshila Junior College is a school in Ujjain, Madhya Pradesh, India.

External links
Official site
 

Education in Ujjain
Schools in Madhya Pradesh
Junior colleges in India
Educational institutions in India with year of establishment missing